Civil may refer to:

Civic virtue, or civility
Civil action, or lawsuit
Civil affairs
Civil and political rights
Civil disobedience
Civil engineering
Civil (journalism), a platform for independent journalism
Civilian, someone not a member of armed forces
Civil law (disambiguation), multiple meanings
Civil liberties
Civil religion
Civil service
Civil society
Civil war
Civil (surname)